The Chair of the Labour Party is a position in the Labour Party of the United Kingdom. The Chair is responsible for administration of the party and overseeing general election campaigns, and is typically held concurrently with another position.

History 
Established by Tony Blair in the aftermath of the 2001 general election, the chair of the Labour Party was a Cabinet position held alongside the minister without portfolio post during his tenure as prime minister. The position is not to be confused with that of Chair of the Labour National Executive Committee, described as 'chair of the party' in the Labour Party Constitution. The role had a larger portfolio for organising election campaigning under Jeremy Corbyn, with Ian Lavery working alongside the co-national campaign coordinator, Andrew Gwynne.

From June 2007 to June 2017 and again from April 2020 to May 2021, the seat was held concurrently by the party's deputy leader. The position was held by Angela Rayner, who was appointed by Sir Keir Starmer following her election as deputy leader, until 2021 when she was sacked after Labour performed poorly at the local elections and the Hartlepool by-election.

List of chairs

References

Organisation of the Labour Party (UK)